Our Mother of Mercy Catholic Church and Parsonage comprise a historic Black Catholic church property located at 1100 and 1104 Evans Avenue in Fort Worth, Texas. The buildings are located in the historic African-American neighborhood in southeast Fort Worth. The church and the parsonage were built in 1929 and 1911, respectively, and historically were staffed by the Josephites. Both buildings were added to the register in 1999.

See also

National Register of Historic Places listings in Tarrant County, Texas

References

External links

Roman Catholic churches in Fort Worth, Texas
Roman Catholic churches in Texas
Houses on the National Register of Historic Places in Texas
National Register of Historic Places in Fort Worth, Texas
Queen Anne architecture in Texas
Roman Catholic churches completed in 1929
Houses in Tarrant County, Texas
Churches on the National Register of Historic Places in Texas
20th-century Roman Catholic church buildings in the United States

African-American Roman Catholic churches
Josephite churches in the United States